The following page lists all pumped-storage hydroelectric power stations that are larger than  in installed generating capacity, which are currently operational or under construction.

List of plants larger than 1000 MW capacity 

 
 

The table below lists currently operational power stations. Some of these may have additional units under construction, but only current installed capacity is listed.

Under construction 
This table lists future 1,000 MW or larger stations that are under construction; some may be partially operational with a current installed capacity under 1,000 MW.

See also 

 List of energy storage projects
 List of hydroelectric power station failures
 Lists of hydroelectric power stations
 List of largest power stations
 United States Department of Energy Global Energy Storage Database

Notes

References 

Hydroelectric
Pumped storage